Sana Javed (born 25 March 1993) is a Pakistani actress who appears in Urdu television. She made her acting debut with a minor role in the acclaimed television series Shehr-e-Zaat (2012). Javed is best known for portraying Sanam Khan in Geo TV's popular drama Khaani for which she received a nomination for Best Actress in Lux Style Awards.

Personal Life 
Javed was born on 25 March 1993 in Jeddah, Saudi Arabia to Pakistani parents. Her family is originally from Hyderabad Deccan. 

After completing school and college from the Pakistan International School in Jeddah, she moved to Karachi with her family and later graduated from the University of Karachi.

In October 2020, she married singer Umair Jaswal in a private Nikah ceremony at her home in Karachi.

Career 

Javed started her career as a model and appeared in television commercials, she started acting with a supporting role in 2012 series Mera Pehla Pyar and did a small appearance in Shehr-e-Zaat in the same year. 

In 2016 Javed rose to prominence with the role of an antagonist in the Hum TV's romantic drama Zara Yaad Kar opposite Zahid Ahmed and Yumna Zaidi. 

In 2017 Javed made her film debut with the socio-comedy film Mehrunisa V Lub U opposite Danish Taimoor. In the same year she was signed for the lead role in Rangreza, alongside Bilal Ashraf, from which she opted herself out due to some reasons. Subsequently, she garnered wide recognition and public appreciation for portraying leading role as Khaani in the romantic drama Khaani. She garnered critical acclaim for her Portrayal of Sameera a rape survivor in Ruswai and Pakistan International Screen Award for Best Television Actress Critics. 

In 2020, Javed was appointed the captain of the team Islamabad Dragons in Jeeto Pakistan League, a Ramadan special reality show. Later that year, she starred in Dunk as a university student who falsely accuses her professor of sexual harassment. The series received negative reviews for its subject and portrayal but her performance was praised.

Filmography

Films

Telefilms

Television

Other Appearances

Music videos

Awards and nominations

References

External links
 
 

1993 births
Hyderabadi Muslims
University of Karachi alumni
Actresses in Urdu cinema
21st-century Pakistani actresses
Living people